Beatrice of Hungary (1290 – 1343 or 1354) was a Dauphine of Viennois by marriage to John II of Viennois.

Life 
She was the elder daughter and the second of three children of Charles Martel of Anjou and Klementia of Habsburg. She was a member of the Capetian House of Anjou. Beatrice was thus maternal granddaughter of Rudolf I of Germany and sister of Charles I of Hungary and Clementia of Hungary.

When Beatrice was just six years old, in 1296, at Naples, she was married to John II of Viennois, who was ten years her senior. The couple had two sons:

When her husband died in 1319, Beatrice became a nun at Cîteaux. Her son founded for her the convent of Saint-Just dans le Royannais.

Beatrice died in 1343 (or 1354). She died in the convent which her sons had founded for her.

Issue
 Guigues VIII (1309 † 1333), dauphin of Viennois. Married to Isabella of France, Dauphine of Viennois
 Humbert II (1312 † 1355), dauphin of Viennois. Married to Marie of Baux

References

Sources

1290 births
14th-century deaths
Year of death uncertain
Capetian House of Anjou
Dauphines of Viennois
13th-century Hungarian people
13th-century Hungarian women
14th-century Hungarian people
14th-century Hungarian women
13th-century French people
13th-century French women
14th-century French people
14th-century French women